The Olenti is a river in the Akmola, Karaganda and Pavlodar regions, Kazakhstan.

The Olenti belongs to the Irtysh basin. The name of the river originated in the Kazakh word for sedge.

Course 
The Olenti has its sources on the eastern slopes of the Yereymentau Mountains of the Kazakh Uplands. It heads roughly northeastwards, skirting the feet of the eastern slopes of the range and bending northwards after a stretch. It bends again northeastwards to the east of lake Teniz and continues in that direction for a long stretch. Shortly before reaching its mouth, the Olenti bends southeastwards and finally it reaches lake Auliekol, entering it from the western shore.

The Olenti flows within a narrow gorge, its width not surpassing , as it heads roughly northwards beneath the mountainous area. The river is fed mainly by snow and groundwater. Its water is fresh and is used for domestic purposes and agricultural field irrigation of the settlements near its banks.

Fauna
The main fish species in the Olenti include pike, crucian carp, perch, roach and tench.

See also
List of rivers of Kazakhstan

References

External links

Central Kazakhstan Petroglyphs

Rivers of Kazakhstan
Akmola Region
Karaganda Region
Pavlodar Region
Endorheic basins of Asia
Irtysh basin